Earl Anthony Johnson (born 1953), better known as Earl Zero, is a Jamaican reggae singer whose career began in the 1970s. He is the uncle of Toronto rapper Raz Fresco.

History
Born 1953 in the Greenwich Town area of Kingston, Johnson was the eldest of ten children, his father a fisherman and his mother a fishmonger. Zero began his career in the 1970s, first as a member of the group Rush-It with his childhood friend Earl "Chinna" Smith, who recorded for producer Bunny Lee, who gave him the name 'Earl Zero' to distinguish him from Smith. His recording of his song "None Shall Escape the Judgement" went unreleased but it was a hit for Johnny Clarke when recorded by the singer in 1974, and Zero first had success as a singer himself with the Al Campbell-produced "Righteous Works" in 1975. He recorded for Don Mais' Roots Tradition label (recording "Home Sweet Home" and "I No Lie"), and joined Tommy Cowan's Talent Corporation roster, and had further success with "Please Officer" and "City of the Weak Heart", released on Cowan's Arab label, the latter also recorded by Jacob Miller on his Killer Miller album. In 1976 he moved on to work with Bertram Brown, recording "Get Happy", and again recorded with Campbell on "Heart Desire". He continued recording through the late 1970s, recording with Soul Syndicate. His first two albums, Visions of Love and In the Right Way, were released in 1979.

In 1979 he relocated to northern California, and continued to record since, with several albums released. His latest album is Marketplace, to be released in Spring 2011 with producer Siahvash Dowlatshahi. The album features members of the Roots Radics, The Greyboy Allstars, The Devastators and others.

Discography
Visions of Love (1979), Epiphany
In the Right Way aka Only Jah Can Ease the Pressure (1979), Freedom Sounds/Student
Roots & Romance (2007)
And God Said to Man (2009), A-Lone
Marketplace (2011), Foreign Key Records
''Earl Zero Meets Sideway'  'Big Fisherman In Dub' (2020), Sideway Outernational Records

References

External links

Earl Zero at Roots Archives
 Foreign Key Records

1953 births
Living people
Jamaican reggae musicians